True is an unincorporated community in Summers County, West Virginia, United States. True is located near West Virginia Route 20, south of Hinton.

History
According to tradition, the name True is derived from the petition for a community post office, which concluded with the line "Now this is true". Another version is that the name was randomly selected by postal officials.

References

Unincorporated communities in Summers County, West Virginia
Unincorporated communities in West Virginia